Damian of Tarsus (Greek: Δαμιανός ό Ταρσεύς, ; died 924), surnamed Ghulam Yazman ("slave/page of Yazman"), was a Byzantine Greek convert to Islam, governor of Tarsus in 896–897 and one of the main leaders of naval raids against the Eastern Roman Empire in the early 10th century.

Biography 
Damian was a convert servant of the eunuch governor of Tarsus Yazman al-Khadim (died 891), who had recognized the overlordship of the Tulunids of Egypt under Ibn Tulun's son Khumarawaih. In October 896, Damian was named governor of Tarsus by the then-governor Ahmad ibn Tughan. Yusuf al-Baghmardi was his deputy and commander of the military forces of the region. Damian and al-Baghmardi, however, were ousted from Tarsus in March/April 897 by a revolt of the pro-Abbasid faction of the city under Raghib, a former mawla of al-Muwaffaq.

In 900, al-Tabari reports that Damian urged the Caliph al-Mu'tadid to burn the fleet of Tarsus, of over 50 large ships, as a revenge for his ouster three years before, a fact which greatly debilitated Muslim naval power. Nevertheless, it was as an admiral that Damian most distinguished himself. In 896 or more likely in 901, he sacked and plundered the port of Demetrias in Greece. Damian then participated in Muhammad ibn Sulayman al-Katib's campaign in winter 904–905 that wrested Egypt from the Tulunids and restored it to Abbasid control; he led a fleet up the river Nile, raided its coasts, and prevented supplies for the Tulunid forces from being ferried over it. In 911, he attacked Cyprus, which since the 7th century had been a neutralized Arab-Byzantine condominium, and ravaged it for four months because its inhabitants had assisted a Byzantine fleet under admiral Himerios in attacking the Caliphate's coasts the year before. Finally, in October 912, along with the fellow-renegade Leo of Tripoli, he scored a decisive victory over Himerios off the island of Chios. In the summer of the same year, he is mentioned as accompanying the governor of the Cilician thughur, Rustam ibn Baradu, in an attack against the Byzantine frontier province of Lykandos and its Armenian governor Melias. Melias was besieged in his fortress, but the Arabs failed to take it.

Damian died in 924 while leading an attack against the Byzantine fortress of Strobilos in the Cibyrrhaeot Theme. His death, along with the probable death of Leo of Tripoli the year before, brought the era of Muslim naval superiority and of constant raids against the Byzantine coasts to an end.

References

Sources 

 

9th-century births
924 deaths
Year of birth unknown
Greek pirates
Greek Muslims
Converts to Islam from Christianity
People of the Arab–Byzantine wars
Abbasid governors of Tarsus
Generals of the Abbasid Caliphate
Admirals of the Abbasid Caliphate
Military personnel killed in action
People from the Tulunid dynasty
Medieval Aegean Sea
Medieval pirates
Slaves from the Abbasid Caliphate